BUtterfield 8 is a 1960 American drama film directed by Daniel Mann, starring Elizabeth Taylor and Laurence Harvey. Taylor won her first Academy Award for her performance in a leading role. The film was based on a 1935 novel of the same name by John O'Hara.

Plot
Gloria Wandrous wakes up in the apartment of wealthy executive Weston Liggett, and finds that he has left her $250. Insulted, she finds her dress was torn, and takes  Liggett's wife Emily's mink coat to cover herself, scrawling "No Sale" in lipstick on the mirror. She orders her telephone answering service, BUtterfield 8, to put Liggett through if he calls.

Gloria visits a childhood friend, pianist Steve Carpenter, who chastises her for wasting her life on one-night stands, but agrees to ask his girlfriend Norma to lend her a dress. Gloria leaves, and Norma tells Steve he must choose between  Gloria and her. As Norma leaves, he calls, "Gloria, don't go like this." "My name is Norma," she corrects.

Liggett takes a train to the countryside, where his wife Emily is caring for her mother. His friend, Bingham Smith, advises him to end his adulterous relationships and return to Bing's law firm, instead of working for his father-in-law's chemical business. Meanwhile, Gloria lies to her mother Annie, claiming to have spent the night at Norma's.

Liggett returns home. Finding the lipstick and money, he phones Gloria to explain the money was meant for her to buy a new dress, to replace the one that he had torn. While drinking later that night, Liggett advises her to ask a high price for her lovemaking talents. She insists she does not take payment from her dates, and claims she has been hired as a model to advertise the dress she is wearing at three bistros that night. Liggett follows Gloria, watching her flirt with dozens of men at several clubs. He drives her to a run-down motel. After sleeping together, Liggett and Gloria decide to explore their relationship further. They spend five days together, growing closer and falling genuinely in love with one another. They part only after Liggett's wife Emily returns.

When Gloria returns home, she confesses to her mother about having been the "slut of all time", but declares that that is all over now, since she is truly in love. Gloria visits her psychiatrist, Dr. Tredman, to insist that her relationship with Liggett has cured her of promiscuity.

For his part, Liggett also plans to change his life, taking up Bing's offer of a job at the law firm. When he returns home, Emily has noticed that her mink is gone. Liggett makes excuses and rushes out to search for Gloria at her regular clubs. He is unable to locate her, but in his search, he is repeatedly confronted with the reality of Gloria's promiscuous past. When Gloria finds Liggett at a bistro the following evening, he drunkenly launches into insults. Gloria drives Liggett to his apartment building where Emily, spotting them from a window above, watches as her husband throws the coat at Gloria, saying he would never give the tainted object back to his wife.

Heartbroken, Gloria goes to Steve, saying that she feels she has "earned" the mink coat she is wearing. Having never before taken payment from the men she slept with, she now has, and she laments "what that makes me". She recounts that when she was 13, a friend of her widowed mother, Major Hartley, taught her about "evil". She hates herself because she loved it and thus went on to make her life out of it. Steve insists that Gloria stay the night, since both Gloria and he have to decide what to do next. Norma arrives the next morning, finding Gloria asleep on Steve's couch; having at last made up his mind, he asks Norma to marry him.

The next day, a now-sober Liggett admits to himself that he still loves Gloria and asks Emily for a divorce. Meanwhile, Gloria tells her mother she is moving to Boston to begin a new life.

Upon discovering Gloria's destination, Liggett drives until he spots her car at a roadside café. He tries to apologize to Gloria by asking her to marry him, but Gloria insists that his insults have "branded" her and that her past is a sore spot that no husband would ever truly be able to accept. They profess their love for each other, and though Gloria initially agrees to go with Liggett to the motel, she ultimately changes her mind and flees in her car. Pursuing Gloria's car, Liggett sees her miss a sign for road construction and accidentally hurtle over an embankment to her death. When he returns to the city, Liggett tells his wife about Gloria's death, announces that he is leaving to "find my pride", and says that if Emily is still home when he returns, they will see if it has any value to them.

Cast
 Elizabeth Taylor as Gloria Wandrous
 Laurence Harvey as Weston Liggett
 Eddie Fisher as Steve Carpenter
 Dina Merrill as Emily Liggett
 Mildred Dunnock as Mrs. Wandrous
 Betty Field as Mrs. Francis Thurber
 Jeffrey Lynn as Bingham Smith
 Kay Medford as Happy
 Susan Oliver as Norma
 George Voskovec as Dr. Tredman

Production
The screenplay was adapted by John Michael Hayes and Charles Schnee from O'Hara's 1935 novel, which in turn was based on the mysterious death of Starr Faithfull in Long Beach, New York in 1931. Faithfull was found dead of drowning on a beach after having apparently been beaten. In O'Hara's novel, Gloria Wandrous, the character based on Faithfull, is killed by falling under the paddle wheel of a steamboat. Aside from optioning the rights to his story, O'Hara was not involved in writing the screenplay for the film, and the film's plot bears only a slight resemblance to his novel.

Location filming was done on City Island in the Bronx; and Stony Point and West Nyack in Rockland County, New York. Studio filming took place at Chelsea Studios in Manhattan.

The café where Liggett finds Gloria as she is going to Boston is an office building, 54 South (Liberty Drive), Stony Point. Happy's Motel, where Gloria and Liggett stay, is the Budget Motor Inn, 87 South Liberty Drive, Stony Point. Liggett takes Gloria to his boat at the Hudson Water Club, Beach Road, West Haverstraw, New York.

In his autobiography Been There, Done That, Fisher wrote that he and Taylor had sex during a lovemaking scene. The scene was cut from the film before its release.

Title
The title of the novel and film "BUtterfield 8" is the number of a telephone exchange for an answering service that follows the pattern of old telephone exchange names in the United States and Canada. Until the early 1970s, telephone exchanges were commonly referred to by name instead of by number. BUtterfield 8 was an exchange that provided service to upper-class neighborhoods of Manhattan's Upper East Side. Dialing the letters "BU" equates to 28 on the lettered telephone dial, so "BUtterfield 8" would equate to 288 as the first three digits of a seven-digit phone number.

The preface to the novel is a notice by the telephone company that an extra digit will be added to all exchanges, "for instance, the exchange BUtterfield will become BUtterfield 8."

Reception
According to MGM records, the film made $6.8 million in the US and Canada and $3.2 million in other countries, resulting in a profit to the studio of $1,857,000 - making it MGM's biggest hit of the year.

Bosley Crowther of The New York Times wrote that "we have the ancient, hackneyed story of the tinseled but tarnished prostitute who thinks she has finally discovered the silver lining for her life in Mr. Right ... By the odds, it should be a bomb. But a bomb it is not, let us tell you ... all we can say is that Miss Taylor lends a certain fascination to the film." Variety declared, "The fact that it manages to be a reasonably arresting experience even though it is carved out of a highly questionable melodrama can be attributed to the keen sense of visual excitement possessed by those who pooled their talents to put it on the screen ... The picture's major asset, dramatically as well as financially, is Miss Taylor, who makes what is becoming her annual bid for an Oscar." John L. Scott of the Los Angeles Times wrote that although the material had a "somewhat flimsy narrative" and "Harvey seems miscast," Taylor gave a "daring, brilliant performance" and "gains another chance to be nominated for an Oscar." Richard L. Coe of The Washington Post called it an "immensely handsome but painfully shallow film" with Taylor its "redeeming feature." Harrison's Reports wrote, "Elizabeth Taylor is magnificent in her portrayal of the model, while Laurence Harvey makes an ideal playboy whose vice-presidency in his wife's family's company calls only for his entertaining of customers. The script is ultra-frank. A big minus is Eddie Fisher, whose Thespian inability harms the otherwise brilliantly acted production." The Monthly Film Bulletin stated, "In this case, the mixture resolutely refuses to come to the boil, due mainly to an inadequate script and theatrical, styleless direction. None of the players is able to sustain interest in the unending stream of smart talk and literary wisecracks and Elizabeth Taylor and Laurence Harvey, in particular, strive for an intensity which only leads to bathos."

Elizabeth Taylor and her then-husband Eddie Fisher hated the film, referring to it as "Butterball Four."  Taylor's now-famous response to the success of the film, made under protest in order to fulfill a contractual obligation to Metro-Goldwyn-Mayer before being allowed to depart to 20th Century Fox to make Cleopatra: "I still say it stinks".

The film holds a score of 47% on Rotten Tomatoes based on 17 reviews.

Accolades

In 2005, the American Film Institute nominated Gloria Wandrous's quote "Mama, face it. I was the slut of all time." from this film for AFI's 100 Years...100 Movie Quotes.

See also
 List of American films of 1960

References

External links

 
 
 
 
 

1960 films
1960 drama films
American drama films
Films about adultery in the United States
Films about child sexual abuse
Films about prostitution in the United States
Films based on American novels
Films directed by Daniel Mann
Films featuring a Best Actress Academy Award-winning performance
Films produced by Pandro S. Berman
Films scored by Bronisław Kaper
Films set in Boston
Films set in New York City
Films shot in Boston
Films shot in New York City
Films with screenplays by John Michael Hayes
Metro-Goldwyn-Mayer films
Films about telephony
1960s English-language films
1960s American films